Gerald Eaton (born November 22, 1971) is a Canadian R&B singer-songwriter and music producer, also known by his stage name Jarvis Church.

Career
Eaton is the lead singer for the R&B-pop group The Philosopher Kings, which reached its peak popularity in the 1990s. During the group's ten-year hiatus, Eaton began a solo career, releasing the album Shake It Off in 2002 under the stage name Jarvis Church, derived from two parallel streets in Toronto, Ontario. The Philosopher Kings subsequently reunited and released a new album in February 2006. In 2008 he released his second solo album called The Long Way Home. In 2012 he released his third solo album The Soul Station Vol 1: The Songs of Sam Cooke, A Tribute, and in 2015 continued with his second in a series of albums spotlighting the music of soul singers called The Soul Station Vol 2: The Songs of Curtis Mayfield, A Tribute.

As a producer, in 1999 he discovered Nelly Furtado at the Honey Jam showcase in Toronto, Ontario, Canada and in 2001 he co-produced Nelly Furtado's debut album Whoa, Nelly!  with his Philosopher Kings bandmate Brian West. In 2001 they were nominated for the producer of the year Grammy. Their production team is known as Track and Field, and they also appear on the production credits of Esthero's album Wikked Lil' Grrrls. Track and Field also produced Canadian rapper K'naan's albums The Dusty Foot Philosopher and Troubadour, and the title track from Stacie Orrico's 2006 album Beautiful Awakening. He appeared on the song "Saturdays" by Nelly Furtado on the album Folklore.

He scored the music for and appeared on the television series Da Kink in My Hair in 2007.

Awards and honors
1995 Juno award for best new group. The Philosopher Kings.
1996 Socan award for best urban music. The Philosopher Kings.
2001 Grammy nomination for producer of the year for Whoa Nelly, Nelly Furtado.
2002 Juno for producer of the year for Whoa Nelly, Nelly Furtado.
2005 Juno for best hip hop album, The Dusty Foot Philosopher, K'naan.
2005 Socan award for pop music, Powerless (say what you want), Folklore, Nelly Furtado.
2010 Socan number one award for Take a Minute, Troubadour, K'naan

Discography

Studio albums
2002: Shake It Off
2008: The Long Way Home
2012: The Soul Station Vol. 1 The Songs of Sam Cooke: A Tribute
2015: The Soul Station Vol. 2: The Songs of Curtis Mayfield: A Tribute

Singles
Shake It Off
Run For Your Life (ft. Esthero)
Who Will Be Your Man
Whole Day Long  
So Beautiful
Lovers Kiss 
Just Like That (ft. Rock Supreme)

References

External links

Official Website for the Philosopher Kings

Canadian rhythm and blues singers
20th-century Black Canadian male singers
Canadian hip hop record producers
21st-century Black Canadian male singers
Jamaican emigrants to Canada
Living people
Musicians from Toronto
People from Thornhill, Ontario
Canadian soul singers
Jack Richardson Producer of the Year Award winners
1971 births